Pia Zerkhold (born 26 October 1998) is an Austrian snowboarder. She competed in the 2022 Winter Olympics, in Women's Snowboard Cross, and Mixed team snowboard cross.

She competed at the 2018–19 FIS Snowboard World Cup, 2019–20 FIS Snowboard World Cup, 2020–21 FIS Snowboard World Cup, and  2021–22 FIS Snowboard World Cup

References 

1988 births
Austrian female snowboarders
Living people
Snowboarders at the 2022 Winter Olympics
Olympic snowboarders of Austria
Snowboarders at the 2016 Winter Youth Olympics